Hyacinthe-Louis De Quélen (8 October 1778 – 31 December 1839) was an Archbishop of Paris.

Biography
De Quélen was born in Paris, in the Quélen noble Breton family. His motto "Em Pob Emser Quelen" and the older Breton expression for "Better death than dishonour" figure in stained glass in the Lazarist church in the rue de Sèvres. He was educated at the College of Navarre and the seminary in St. Sulpice. 

Ordained in 1807, he served a year as Vicar-General of Saint-Brieuc and then became secretary to Cardinal Fesch, uncle to Napoleon Bonaparte. When the latter was exiled from his diocese of Lyon under the Bourbon Restoration, de Quélen exercised his ministry at St. Sulpice and in the military hospitals. Under the Bourbons, he became successively spiritual director of the schools in the archdiocese, Vicar-General of Paris, and coadjutor archbishop to the Cardinal de Talleyrand-Périgord, succeeding the latter in 1821.

A good preacher, he was favored by Louis XVIII and then Charles X, but retained some measure of independence. As a peer of the realm he opposed, on behalf of the middle classes, the conversion of the national debt. At his reception into the Académie française he publicly lauded Chateaubriand, then in disgrace. While blessing the cornerstone of the Chapelle Expiatoire, he requested in vain an amnesty for the exiled members of the Convention. The ordinance of 1828, disbanding the Jesuits and limiting the recruiting of the clergy, was also issued against his advice.

Although de Quélen had not approved of the royal ordinance of July 1830, which aimed at restoring absolute monarchy and instead triggered the July Revolution, he was nevertheless held in suspicion of legitimism by the House of Orléans. On one occasion Louis-Philippe said to him: "Archbishop, remember that more than one mitre has been torn asunder". "Sire", replied the archbishop, "God protect the crown of the king, for many royal crowns too have been shattered".

Apart from official functions such as the christening of the Comte de Paris, the obsequies of the Duke of Orléans and the Te Deum sung in honour of the French victory in Africa, he therefore confined himself to his episcopal duties, visiting the parishes of the diocese, looking after the religious instruction of military recruits, and organizing his clergy. In the outbreaks which followed the Revolution of 1830 the archbishop was twice driven from his palace by the mobs of Paris. However, when the epidemic of 1832 broke out, he transformed his seminaries into hospitals, personally ministered to the sick at the Hôtel-Dieu, and founded at his own expense the "Oeuvre des orphelins du choléra".

He is also remembered for denying the last sacraments of the Church to the dying Abbé Grégoire unless the latter would retract his oath to the Civil Constitution of the Clergy, which the Abbé refused to do.

De Quélen himself died shortly after, having had the joy of witnessing the conversion of the apostate Bishop of Autun, the Prince de Talleyrand, whose sincerity however has been questioned. Ravignan eulogized him at Notre-Dame, and Louis-Mathieu Molé at the Académie française. From de Quélen's episcopate date the "Société de St. Vincent de Paul", the "Conferences apologétiques de Notre-Dame" and several religious institutes, among which are the nursing Sisters of Bon-Secours.

Legacy
Besides the eulogies on Louis XVI (Paris, 1816), on Madame Elizabeth (Paris, 1817), on the Duke de Berry (Paris, 1830), his "Discours de réception à l'académie française" (Paris, 1824), and some 120 pastoral letters, there is the "Manuels pour l'administration des Sacrements de l'Eucharistie et de l'Extrême-Onction: du Baptême des Enfants: du Marriage" (3 vols., Paris, 1837–38) collected in the "Rituel de Paris".

References

1778 births
1839 deaths
University of Paris alumni
Archbishops of Paris
19th-century Roman Catholic archbishops in France
Members of the Académie Française
Members of the Chamber of Peers of the Bourbon Restoration
Burials at Notre-Dame de Paris